Sambuca Classica (foaled February 21, 2004, in New York) is a Thoroughbred mare best known as the dam of 2016 Champion Two-Year-Old Colt Classic Empire. She was an unsuccessful race mare, not winning in eight career starts and even starting once in a Maiden Claiming, but has proven to be more successful as a broodmare, with all five of her foals to race to date being winners.

Background
Sambuca Classica is a small chestnut mare with a star, strip, a sock on her right front and left rear leg, and a coronet mark on her right rear. She was raced by her breeders, Anstu Farm, for her three career starts in 2006, with her best finish being fourth-place. She was purchased by Steven and Brandi Nicholson, but did not race again until August of her three-year-old season. She failed to finish higher than third-place in her five subsequent starts. She was retired in 2008 to become a broodmare.

Progeny Record
 2009: Song Girl, a bay filly by Songandaprayer. She won 3 of 13 races for earnings of $84,644, with her best win being a Starter Allowance.
 2010: Anytime Magic, a chestnut gelding by Fusaichi Pegasus. He won 15 of 64 races for earnings of $202,945, with wins in the Lost in the Fog Stakes and the Everett Nevin Stakes at two.
 2011: bred to Afleet Alex but did not produce a foal. 
 2012: bred to Warrior's Reward but did not produce a foal.
 2013: Uptown Twirl, a bay filly by Twirling Candy. She won 4 of 9 races for earnings of $170,714, with wins in the Surfside Stakes and the Pleasanton Oaks at three.
 2014: Classic Empire, a bay colt by Pioneerof the Nile. He won 5 of 9 races for earnings of $2,520,220, with wins in the Bashford Manor Stakes, Breeders' Futurity Stakes, and Breeders' Cup Juvenile at two, and was named Champion Two-Year-Old Colt. He won the Arkansas Derby and finished second in the Preakness Stakes at three.
 2015: Exclamation Point, a chestnut colt by Concord Point. He has won 3 of 4 races so far in his career.
 2016: aborted foal by Uncle Mo.
 2017: Classic Girl, a chestnut filly by Candy Ride.
 2018: Harvard, a bay colt by Pioneerof the Nile.
 2019: bred to Pioneerof the Nile but did not produce a foal.
 2020: bred to Justify.

Pedigree

References

2004 racehorse births
Racehorses bred in New York (state)
Racehorses trained in the United States
Thoroughbred family 4-m